Adventist University of West Africa is a private Christian co-educational school owned and operated by the Seventh-day Adventist Church in Liberia. The university is located in Schieffelin, a town located 35 km east of Monrovia, Liberia.

It is a part of the Seventh-day Adventist education system, the world's second largest Christian school system.

History
The Adventists University of West Africa's Nursing School began classes in 2011 on the campus of Adventist High School. In 2012, ground was broken on the permanent site, the first student elections were held, and the nursing school moved into its permanent location. In 2018, the university's fourth class graduated, with the graduation's keynote speaker being Vice President Jewel Howard Taylor. In 2019, the nursing school was accredited by the Liberia Board of Nursing and Midwifery.

See also

 List of Seventh-day Adventist colleges and universities
 Seventh-day Adventist education
 Seventh-day Adventist Church
 Seventh-day Adventist theology
 History of the Seventh-day Adventist Church

References 

Universities and colleges affiliated with the Seventh-day Adventist Church
Universities and colleges in Monrovia
2011 establishments in Liberia